Grammothele lacticolor is a poroid crust fungus in the family Polyporaceae that is found in the United States. It was described as new to science in 2015 by Norwegian mycologist Leif Ryvarden.

References

lacticolor
Fungi described in 2015
Fungi of the United States
Taxa named by Leif Ryvarden
Fungi without expected TNC conservation status